Melophagus is a genus of biting flies in the family of louse flies, Hippoboscidae. There are three known species and one subspecies. All are parasites of bovids. All are wingless.

Distribution
They are native to Europe, Asia and North Africa. M. ovinus ovinus has been introduced to most parts of the world where domestic sheep are kept.

Hosts 
All are parasites of cloven-hoofed mammals - Family Bovidae, including domestic sheep, domestic cattle, the Mongolian gazelle (Procapra gutturosa), the chamois (Rupicapra rupicapra), the alpine ibex (Capra ibex), the yak (Bos grunniens), plus doubtful records on the argali (Ovis ammon),  the bighorn sheep (Ovis canadensis) and the Dall sheep (Ovis dalli).

Females could only mate until 24 hours of emergence from the puparium, after which they stored sufficient sperms to fertilize the egg production.

Systematics
Genus Melophagus Latreille, 1802
M. antilopes (Pallas, 1777)
M. ovinus ovinus (Linnaeus, 1758)
M. ovinus himalayae Maa, 1969
M. rupicaprinus Rondani, 1879

References 
3. Small, Richard W. “A Review of Melophagus Ovinus (L.), the Sheep Ked.” Veterinary Parasitology., vol. 130, no. 1-2, Elsevier, 2005, pp. 141–55, doi:10.1016/j.vetpar.2005.03.005.

Parasitic flies
Parasitic arthropods of mammals
Hippoboscidae
Hippoboscoidea genera
Taxa named by Pierre André Latreille